Hyalocalyx is a monotypic genus of flowering plants belonging to the family Passifloraceae. The only species is Hyalocalyx setifer.

H. setifer is an annual herb, growing up to 27 cm tall. Its native range is Tanzania to Mozambique, Madagascar. H. setifer exhibits both distylous and homostylous flowers. Its flowers are cylindrical, 5-6 mm long, and range from pale yellow to orange in color.

References

Passifloraceae
Monotypic Malpighiales genera